Dmitry Dmitrievich Krylov (born 29 September 1946, the Sea of Okhotsk) is a Soviet and Russian television journalist, actor, author and presenter of the TV program Mischievous notes (1996) and Telescope (Sputnik viewer). Head Workshop journalism faculty of Moscow Institute of Television and Radio Broadcasting  Ostankino.

Since June 1998  Member of the Presidium of the National Guild of tourism press.

Personal life 
wife Tatiana Barinova  editor and correspondent
son  wife Dmitry (born 1980)  the operator
 son from his third marriage Dmitry Krylov (born 1987)

Filmography 
 1989 —  Mystery Endhauz as  Arthur Hastings 
 1991 —  How to live, carp? as cameo
 1991 —  Moscow Beauty as leading beauty contest '
 1992 —  Forgiveness as Arkady Markovich  
 2008 —  Big Difference as cameo''

References

External links
 Dmitry  Krylov Online  KinoPoisk
 Дмитрий Крылов: «Негры с Ямайки и Тобаго похожи на русских»

1946 births
Living people
Russian television presenters
Soviet television presenters
Soviet journalists
Russian male journalists
Soviet male film actors
Russian journalists